Janina Zakrzewska (December 12, 1928 in Warsaw – May 27, 1995) was a Polish lawyer. She was a professor of University of Warsaw (since 1982), member of the Polish Academy of Sciences (since 1989), member of the Helsinki Committee, member of the International PEN, member of the Państwowa Komisja Wyborcza, judge of the Constitutional Tribunal of the Republic of Poland (1989–1995). Zakrzewska was a participant of the Polish Round Table Talks.

Her notable works includes Spór o parlament (1961) and Kontrola konstytucyjności ustaw (1964).

References

1928 births
1995 deaths
Polish non-fiction writers
20th-century Polish lawyers
Polish women lawyers
20th-century women lawyers
20th-century non-fiction writers
20th-century Polish women